Yuri Borisovich Pantyukhov (15 March 1931 – 22 October 1982) was a Russian ice hockey player. He played in 68 games for the Soviet Union national team from 1955 to 1959, scoring 32 goals, and was a member of the national team that won the ice hockey gold medal at the 1956 Winter Olympics.

Pantyukhov played in the Soviet Hockey League for HC CSKA Moscow and Krylya Sovetov Moscow, scoring 121 goals in 230 appearances.

He was born in Moscow, Soviet Union, and inducted into the Russian and Soviet Hockey Hall of Fame in 1956.

External links

 Russian and Soviet Hockey Hall of Fame bio
 Sports Reference information page

1931 births
1982 deaths
HC CSKA Moscow players
Ice hockey players at the 1956 Winter Olympics
Medalists at the 1956 Winter Olympics
Olympic gold medalists for the Soviet Union
Olympic ice hockey players of the Soviet Union
Olympic medalists in ice hockey
Ice hockey people from Moscow
Soviet ice hockey right wingers